Matthew Francis may refer to:
Matthew Francis (poet) (born 1956), British poet
Matthew Francis (footballer) (born 1270), former Australian rules footballer
Matthew Francis (producer), British television and theatrical producer
Matt Francis (born 1985), ice hockey player

See also

Matt Francis (Born 1990), former CJFL quarterback, Candidate for Ward 5 Councillor